Vertical TV is a Canadian English language exempted Category B specialty channel that broadcasts religious programming dedicated to the Christian faith with a focus on urban communities. It is owned by Vertical Entertainment.

The channel broadcasts both ministry programming and entertainment programming with a focus on Christian values such as music specials, children's series, music videos, and more.

History
The channel launched in July 2015 in Canada.

References

External links

English-language television stations in Canada
Religious television networks in Canada
Christian mass media in Canada
Evangelical television networks
Television channels and stations established in 2015
Digital cable television networks in Canada
2015 establishments in Ontario